The 2010 LET Access Series was a series of professional women's golf tournaments held from March through November 2010 across Europe. The LET Access Series is the second-tier women's professional golf tour in Europe and is the official developmental tour of the Ladies European Tour.

Tournament results
The table below shows the 2010 schedule. The numbers in brackets after the winners' names show the number of career wins they had on the LET Access Series up to and including that event.

Order of Merit rankings
The top two players on the LETAS Order of Merit earned LET membership for the Ladies European Tour. Players finishing in positions 3–20 got to skip the first stage of the qualifying event and automatically progress to the final stage of the Lalla Aicha Tour School.

See also
2010 Ladies European Tour
2010 in golf

References

External links

LET Access Series seasons
LET Access Series
LET Access Series